Homalanthus stokesii is a species of plant in the family Euphorbiaceae. It is endemic to French Polynesia.

References

Hippomaneae
Flora of French Polynesia
Near threatened plants
Taxonomy articles created by Polbot
Taxobox binomials not recognized by IUCN